Bridey Condren (born 16 December 1999) is an Australian netballer, playing for the Sunshine Coast Lightning in the Suncorp Super Netball league.

Condren's first professional team was the Queensland Firebirds as a training partner, sitting on the bench for one game in 2019. In 2020, she moved to the West Coast Fever as cover for an injured Courtney Bruce, playing one game. In 2022, she joined the Sunshine Coast Lightning and made her debut against the New South Wales Swifts.

References

External links
 Sunshine Coast Lightning profile
 Suncorp Super Netball profile
 Instagram account

1999 births
Australian netball players
Sunshine Coast Lightning players
West Coast Fever players
Living people
Suncorp Super Netball players
Australian Netball League players
Netball players from Queensland
Queensland Fusion players
People educated at John Paul College (Brisbane)
Queensland state netball league players
Sportspeople from Mackay, Queensland